The Mithraeum of Dura Europos was found during excavations in the city in 1934. It is considered to be one of the best-preserved and best-documented cult buildings of Mithraism.

The temple is located in the northwest of the city, near the city wall. It is a free-standing building made of adobe bricks. The execution of the masonry is described in the preliminary report as rather poor. There were three construction phases. At the beginning it was a cult room built into a residential building, which over the years has been expanded and further decorated. The temple is at the ground level, and resembles a basilica inside. These are rather atypical elements for mithraeum, as they were mostly designed underground and grotto-like.

History and description

Also partially preserved by the defensive embankment was the Mithraeum (CIMRM 34–70), located between towers 23 and 24. It was unearthed in January 1934 after years of expectation as to whether Dura would reveal traces of the Roman Mithras cult. The earliest archaeological traces found within the temple are from between AD 168 and 171, which coincides with the arrival of Lucius Verus and his troops. At this stage it was still a room in a private home. It was extended and renovated between 209 and 211, and most of the frescoes are from this period. The tabula ansata of 210 offers salutation to Septimus Severus, Caracalla and Geta. The construction was managed by a centurio principe praepositus of the legio IIII Scythicae et XVI Flaviae firmae (CIMRM 53), and it seems that construction was done by imperial troops. The mithraeum was enlarged again in 240, but in 256—with war with Sassanians looming—the sanctuary was filled in and became part of the strengthened fortifications. Following excavations, the temple was transported in pieces to New Haven, Connecticut, where it was rebuilt (and is now on display) at the Yale University Art Gallery.

The surviving frescoes, graffiti and dipinti (which number in the dozens) are of enormous interest to the study of the social composition of the cult. The statuary and altars were found intact, as also the typical relief of Mithras slaying the bull, with the hero-god dressed as usual in "oriental" costume ("trousers, boots, and pointed cap"). As is typical for mithraea in the Roman provinces in the Greek East, the inscriptions and graffiti are mostly in Greek, with the rest in Palmyrene (and some Hellenized Hebrew). The end of the sanctuary features an arch with a seated figure on each of the two supporting columns. Inside and following the form of the arch is a series of depictions of the zodiac. Within the framework of the now-obsolete theory that the Roman cult was "a Roman form of Mazdaism" ("la forme romaine du mazdeisme"), Cumont supposed that the two Dura friezes represented the two primary figures of his Les Mages hellénisés, i.e. "Zoroaster" and "Ostanes". This reading has not found a footing; "the two figures are Palmyrene in all their characteristic traits" and are more probably portraits of leading members of that mithraeum's congregation of Syrian auxiliaries.

First phase
The first building was erected shortly before 168 AD. Its main room was only 4.65 m long and 5.80 m wide. In addition there were two smaller rooms. A dedicatory inscription dates this building to the year 168. The inscription dates from the Stragegos Ethpeni, son of Zabde'a and is in Palmyrisch written and placed on a relief which Mithras shows how he kills the bull (Tauroctony). A second short Greek inscription just repeats his name. Rostovtzeff suspected that it was the earliest cult image in the sanctuary.

A second cult image was dates just two years later. It shows a similar scene, but with some different features. The Greek dedicatory inscription reads: "For the god Mithras, made by Zenobios, who is also called Eiaebas, son of Yaribol, strategos of the archers, in the year 482 (170-171 AD)". To the right of the bull there are spectators, which otherwise is not documented for tauroctony scenes. Three of the viewers have captions. The largest figure, on the far right, is Zenobius, the donor of the relief. The other two characters are Jariboles and Barnaadath. Another peculiarity of the relief are seven balls between the bull's front hooves. The interpretation is uncertain, but the Iranian worldview divides the world into seven continents. So the representation of these seven parts of the world may be an allusion to Mithras, Lord of the whole world.

Second and third phase
Two more cult reliefs were discovered. The smaller, older one, stood below the larger one and was possibly covered by a curtain. Tommaso Gnoli suspects that there were once two mithraeums in Dura Europos. One of them was abandoned and the cult image was brought here.

The second phase of construction dates from around AD 210 to 240 and was done by Roman soldiers under the direction of Antonius Valentius. In this phase the main room was expanded to 10.90 m. It was now mainly decorated with wall paintings. In the third phase, the building was expanded and decorated. In the main room of each phase there was an altar, and in the last phase there was even a separate chancel. The two cult reliefs were also located here. The rich wall paintings of the temple originate from the second construction phase, including Mithras as hunters, two magicians and burning altars. There were over 200 short inscriptions in the building. This also includes the signature of the painter Mareos, who painted the cult room.

The whole sanctuary was dismantled after the excavation and moved to the Yale University Art Gallery. The cult niche has been reconstructed and exhibited there.

Mareos 
Mareos (or Mareinos) was a painter known by his signature in the mithraeum. The paintings there are dated to the middle of the third century AD. The short inscription reads: "For the salvation of Mareos, the painter (Νάμα Μαρέῳ ζωγράφῳ)". The paintings in the mithraeum are relatively well preserved, but are described by most modern authors as not of particularly high quality. He may have been a local artist with limited skills. With a foreign painter one would expect a better quality of the work. Mareos is blessed in the short inscription, using the word namais. This word is of Persian origin and is often used in the Mithras cult as a particularly solemn blessing formula in the sense of "for salvation ...". So Mareos was very likely a follower of Mithraism.

References

Sources
Dirven, L.A. 1999 The Palmyrenes of Dura-Europos : a study of religious interaction in Roman Syria (Leiden: Brill).
Hopkins, C, 1979 The Discovery of Dura Europos, (New Haven and London).
Rostovtzeff, M.I., 1938. Dura-Europos and Its Art (Oxford University Press).
 .
 .
 Tommaso Gnoli: The Mithraeum of Dura-Europos, in: Ted Kaizer (Hrsg.): Religion, Society and Culture at Dura-Europos, Yale Classical Studies 38, Cambridge 2016, pp. 126–143
 M. I. Rostovtzeff, F. E. Brown, C. B. Welles: The excavations at Dura-Europos: Preliminary Report of Seventh and Eighth Season of Work 1933–1934 and 1934–1935. Yale University Press, New Haven/London/Leipzig/Prag 1939, pp. 62–134.

Further reading 
Ann Perkins, The Art of Dura-Europos, 1st ed. (Oxford: Oxford University Press, 1973), 49–52, pl. 15, ill.
Clark Hopkins, The Discovery of Dura-Europos, ed. Bernard Goldman (New Haven, Conn.: Yale University Press, 1979), 193–205, ill.
Christa Bauchenss-Thüriedl, Erika Simon, and Ingrid Krauskopf, Lexicon Iconographicum Mythologiae Classicae, 8 vols. (Zurich: Artemis, 1981–97), vol. 6, p. 609, no. 328, pl. 358 .
Susan B. Matheson, Dura-Europos: The Ancient City and the Yale Collection, 1st (New Haven, Conn.: Yale University Art Gallery, 1982), 21, fig. 19.
Katherine M Kiefer and Susan B. Matheson, Life in an Eastern Province: The Roman Fortress at Dura-Europos, exh. cat. (New Haven, Conn.: Yale University Art Gallery, 1982), no. 11.
Christy Cunningham, “The Conservation of the Mithraeum in the Yale University Art Gallery,” Yale University Art Gallery Bulletin 39, no. 2 (Fall 1984): 12–15, fig. 1–5.
Handbook of the Collections, exh. cat. (New Haven, Conn.: Yale University Art Gallery, 1992), 270, ill.
D. Jason Cooper, Mithras: Mysteries and Initiation Rediscovered (York Beach, Maine: Samuel Weiser, Inc., 1996), 79, 84–5, Color illus. central niche and 1935.100e cover, fig. 3, 8,9.
Lisa R. Brody and Gail Hoffman, eds., Dura-Europos: Crossroads of Antiquity (Boston: McMullen Museum of Art, 2011), 31n35.
Lisa R. Brody and Gail Hoffman, eds., Roman in the Provinces: Art on the Periphery of Empire (Chestnut Hill, Mass.: McMullen Museum of Art, 2014), 131, fig. 8.7.

External links 

 Das Mithraeum von Dura-Europos in Syrien (in German)
 Photographs from the archive of the Yale Art Museum

Fresco paintings in Syria
3rd-century paintings
3rd-century religious buildings and structures
Roman Empire art
Ancient Roman buildings and structures in Syria
Dura-Europos
Buildings and structures in Deir ez-Zor Governorate
1934 archaeological discoveries